Toei or Tōei may refer to:

 Tōei, Aichi, Japan
 Toei Company, Japanese film and television production company
 Toei Animation, their animation subsidiary
 , Japanese abbreviation meaning "operated by the Tokyo Metropolitan Government"
Transportation lines operated by the Tokyo Metropolitan Bureau of Transportation (TMBT)
 Toei Subway (都営地下鉄)
 Toei Bus (都営バス)
 Toei Jūtaku (都営住宅), public housing owned and managed by the Bureau of Urban Development, Tokyo Metropolitan Government